Washington Township is a township in Clarke County, Iowa, USA.  As of the 2000 census, its population was 284.

Geography
According to the USGS, it contains one cemetery, Field.

References
 USGS Geographic Names Information System (GNIS)

External links
 US-Counties.com
 City-Data.com

Townships in Clarke County, Iowa
Townships in Iowa